Maurice Woodward (21 October 1891 – 17 February 1950) was an English professional footballer who played as a half back and left back in the Football League for Wolverhampton Wanderers and Leicester Fosse.

Personal life 
Woodward served as a sergeant in the Football Battalion of the Middlesex Regiment during the First World War. He suffered a knee injury and from sciatica during the war. He later became a publican in Wall Heath.

Career statistics

References

1891 births
People from Enderby, Leicestershire
Footballers from Leicestershire
1950 deaths
English footballers
Association football wing halves
Association football fullbacks
Leicester United F.C. players
Leicester City F.C. players
Southend United F.C. players
Wolverhampton Wanderers F.C. players
Bristol Rovers F.C. players
Southern Football League players
English Football League players
Middlesex Regiment soldiers
British Army personnel of World War I
Brentford F.C. wartime guest players
Publicans
FA Cup Final players
Military personnel from Leicestershire